The Scarborough Connector, unsigned State Route 701 (SR 701), is a  freeway located in southern Maine which connects U.S. Route 1 (US 1) and SR 9 in Scarborough to Interstate 295 (I-295) in South Portland. The Scarborough Connector functions as part of a bypass of South Portland and as part of a connecting route between downtown Scarborough, The Maine Mall, and the Maine Turnpike (I-95).

The SR 701 designation is only indicated on mileposts, which increase from north to south as opposed to the standard practice of increasing from south to north. All other signage refers to the major routes to which it connects (I-95, I-295 and US 1).

Route description 
The Scarborough Connector begins in the north as an offshoot of I-295 at exit 2 in South Portland. There is one southbound interchange with the Maine Turnpike Approach Road eastbound, which provides a connection to US 1 north and downtown South Portland. The freeway crosses into Scarborough and continues south for  before merging onto US 1 south / SR 9 west towards downtown. Traffic may use the nearby intersection at Hillcrest Avenue to change direction.

In the south, the Connector begins as a left exit from US 1 north / SR 9 east and heads due north. The first northbound exit leads to the Maine Turnpike Approach Road westbound, which leads to The Maine Mall and the Maine Turnpike (I-95). A second exit connects to Broadway in downtown South Portland. Following the Broadway exit, the freeway merges onto I-295 north towards Portland.

History 
The Scarborough Connector was originally designated as an Inventory Road, #072037, without a numeric designation. The SR 701 designation was added later and the number posted on mileposts along the highway.

Exit list 
Exits are listed in order from north to south as mileposts increase in that direction.

References

External links 

Transportation in Cumberland County, Maine
Freeways in the United States
701
Scarborough, Maine